is a railway station in the city of  Toyohashi, Aichi Prefecture, Japan, operated by Central Japan Railway Company (JR Tōkai).

Lines
Shimoji Station is served by the Iida Line, and is located 2.2 kilometers from the southern terminus of the line at Toyohashi Station.

Station layout
The station has two side platforms built on an embankment, connected by an underpass crossing. The area in between the side platforms is filled in, forming what is effectively an island platform. The station building has automated ticket machines, TOICA automated turnstiles and is unattended.

Platforms

Adjacent stations

|-
!colspan=5|Central Japan Railway Company

Station history
On August 1, 1943, the Toyokawa Railway was nationalized along with some other local lines to form the Japanese Government Railways (JGR) Iida Line and Shimoji became a full station at that time. The current station building was constructed in 1974. The station has been unattended since April 1985. Along with its division and privatization of JNR on April 1, 1987, the station came under the control and operation of the Central Japan Railway Company.

Station numbering was introduced to the Iida Line in March 2018; Shimoji Station was assigned station number CE02.

Passenger statistics
In fiscal 2017, the station was used by an average of 194 passengers daily.

Surrounding area
 Toyokawa River
 Japan National Route 1

See also
 List of Railway Stations in Japan

References

External links

Railway stations in Japan opened in 1943
Railway stations in Aichi Prefecture
Iida Line
Stations of Central Japan Railway Company
Toyohashi